Dave Huismans (born 1979), better known by his stage name 2562, is a musician from The Hague, Netherlands.

Huismans bought his first laptop dedicated for music production in 2003 despite not knowing how to read musical notation.

Having previously released records of various musical styles under the monikers A Made Up Sound and Dogdaze, Huismans created 2562, under which his output is generally described as dubstep. He is known for producing dubstep that takes influence from techno as well.

The debut 2562 album, Aerial (Tectonic Records, 2008), was released to favourable reviews.

Discography

Albums
 In Dog We Trust (2006), Dogdaze Productions – as Dogdaze
 Aerial (2008), Tectonic – as 2562
 Shortcuts (produced 2004, released 2008), - as Made Up Sound
 Unbalance (2009), Tectonic – as 2562
 Fever (2011), When In Doubt – as 2562
 Air Jordan (2012), When In Doubt - as 2562
 The new today (2014), When In Doubt - as 2562

Singles
 Kameleon (2007), Tectonic – as 2562
 Channel Two (2007), Tectonic – as 2562
 Techno Dread / Enforcers (2008), Tectonic – as 2562

References

External links
 2562 on Myspace
 
 FactMagazine interview (05/2008)
 Beatportal interview (10/2008)
 2562 Unbalance Artwork Designer (10/2008)

1979 births
Dubstep musicians
Future garage musicians
Dutch electronic musicians
Living people
Musicians from The Hague
Electronic dance music DJs